The 1993 World Indoor Target Archery Championships were held in Perpignan, France.

Medal summary (Men's individual)

Medal summary (Women's individual)

Notes 
Freestyle events changed name to Recurve events.

References

E
International archery competitions hosted by France
1993 in French sport